The Jungle Prada Site (also known as Jungle Mound or Anderson-Narváez Site) is an archaeological site featuring Indigenous Tocobaga mounds and the location of the historical Narváez expedition landing. The Jungle Prada site spans public and private property, including the Jungle Prada de Narvaez city park, in St. Petersburg of Pinellas County, western coastal Florida, in the Southern United States.

The Jungle Prada Site was added, on February 4, 2003, to the  National Register of Historic Places.

History

The Tocobaga tribe inhabited the Jungle Prada site for approximately 600 years, from 1000 to 1600 CE. The portion of the mounds that are on private property are considered "archeologically pristine."

The Diocese of St. Petersburg placed a marker at the Jungle Prada site, acknowledging it as the location of the first Catholic Mass in Florida.

Location
The Jungle Prada site spans both public and private land. Portions of the Tocobaga mounds, as well as picnic tables, a fishing pier, and boat launch are located within the city park, and are maintained by the City of St. Petersburg. The better-preserved mounds, along with a small archeological museum, are located on private property and are accessible by guided tour. The Jungle Prada site is located on the eastern shore of Boca Ciega Bay, at Park Street North and Elbow Lane (17th Avenue) in St. Petersburg, Florida.

See also
 Spanish colonization of the Americas

References

External links

 National Register of Historic Places: Pinellas County place listings
 Florida's Office of Cultural and Historical Programs: Pinellas County listings
 Pinellas County Planning Department as staff for the Pinellas County Planning Council. (PCPD) Pinellas County Historical Background.
 Straub, W. L. History of Pinellas County. (Straub) The Record Company. St. Augustine, Florida. 1929.
 stpete.org: St. Petersburg Parks

Archaeological sites in Florida
Parks in Pinellas County, Florida
Spanish Florida
Jungle Prada Site
Geography of St. Petersburg, Florida
Colonial United States (Spanish)
Florida Native American Heritage Trail
Tourist attractions in St. Petersburg, Florida
Mounds in Florida
2003 establishments in Florida